Finbar Lebowitz is an Irish film, set in Dublin about a working class Irishman called Finbar. It stars David McCarton and The Dubliners founder Ronnie Drew.

Plot summary
Finbar is a working class Irishman who works for a delivery company in Dublin. He holds s somewhat racist and prejudiced view of America. While on delivery he stops at a bookstore run by Shimon Abramsky, an elderly Jewish man who has his niece Leah from New York City stopping with him to help out. After a conversation with Leah, Finbar becomes obsessed with her and makes it his goal to woo her after a dare from his delivery friend. Finbar even tries to convert to Judaism, to the consternation of his strict Catholic priest and family. It takes more than a conversion to win Leah's heart.

References

External links
 

2000 films
English-language Irish films
2000s English-language films